Marco Antonio Solís Sosa (born 29 December 1959) is a Mexican musician, singer, composer, and record producer.

Born and raised in Ario de Rosales, Michoacán, Solís began his musical career at the age of six, performing part of Los Hermanitos Solís. In 1975  he co-founded Los Bukis, of which he was the lead vocalist and guitarist. The band split up after nearly two decades of success, with Solís pursuing a solo career. Solís released his first solo album, En Pleno Vuelo in 1996 by Fonovisa Records.

Solís has been awarded five Latin Grammy Awards, two Lo Nuestro Awards, has a star on the Hollywood Walk of Fame, and has been inducted into the Billboard Latin Music Hall of Fame.

In 2022, Solís was recognized as Person of the Year by the Latin Recording Academy.

Early life and career
Marco Antonio Solís began performing at age six as part of "Los Hermanitos Solís" with his cousin, Joel Solís. In the mid-1970s he formed "Los Bukis" with whom he achieved success  in Mexico, Central America, South America, and the United States. As lead singer and chief songwriter of Los Bukis, Solís became known in the industry for outside writing and producing for popular singers such as Marisela and Rocío Dúrcal. In 1995, after almost 20 years of working with the group, he decided to pursue a solo career.

As a solo artist he has remained popular in his native Mexico as well throughout Latin America and Spain, and the United States with more than thirty entries on Billboard's Hot Latin Tracks chart, including multiple number one hits. He has worked with Olga Tañón, Ana Bárbara, Enrique Iglesias, Chayanne, Marc Anthony and Anaís, among others. On 5 August 2010, Solís received his star on the Hollywood Walk of Fame. Marco Antonio Solís appeared as a vocal coach in the third season of La Voz... México and won the competition. He went on tour to promote his album Gracias Por Estar Aqui a few weeks after.
His album, "Gracias Por Estar Aquí", was released 22 October 2013 and debuted at #1 on Billboards Top Latin Albums chart.

Solís provided the Spanish-dubbing of Ernesto de la Cruz, the main antagonist of the 2017 Disney-Pixar film Coco.

Solís returned to Billboard’s Regional Mexican Airplay chart for the first time in over two decades as “Se Veía Venir” climbed to No. 1 on the ranking dated October 2, 2021.

Discography

Studio albums
 1996: En Pleno Vuelo
 1997: Marco
 1999: Trozos de Mi Alma
 2001: Más de Mi Alma
 2003: Tu Amor o Tu Desprecio
 2004: Razón de Sobra
 2006: Trozos de Mi Alma, Vol. 2
 2008: No Molestar
 2010: En Total Plenitud
 2013: Gracias Por Estar Aquí

Compilations, duets and live albums
 1998: Los Grandes Éxitos de Marco Antonio Solís y Los Bukis: Recuerdos, Tristeza y Soledad
 2000: En Vivo
 2001: En Vivo, Vol. 2
 2002: Los Grandes (with Joan Sebastian)
 2003: La Historia Continúa...
 2004: Dos Grandes (with Joan Sebastian)
 2005: La Historia Continúa... Parte II
 2005: Dos Idolos (with Pepe Aguilar)
 2007: La Historia Continúa... Parte III
 2007: La Mejor... Colección 
 2008: Una Noche en Madrid (en vivo)
 2009: La Más Completa Colección
 2009: Más de Marco Antonio Solís
 2012: La Historia Continúa... Parte IV
 2012: Una Noche de Luna (en vivo)
 2014: Antología
 2015: 15 Inolvidables
 2015: 15 Inolvidables Vol. 2
 2015: Por Amor a Morelia Michoacán (en vivo)
 2016: 40 Años
 2020: Con Amor y Sentimiento

Singles

Songs featured in telenovelas

1997: El Alma no Tiene Color – "El Alma no Tiene Color" (duet with Laura Flores)
1999: Girasoles Para Lucía aired in Argentina – "Si No Te Huberias Ido"
1999: Serafin  – "Está en Tí"
2000: Siempre te amaré – "Sigue Sin Mí"
2001: Salomé – "Si No Te Hubieras Ido"
2001: Salomé – "Cuando Te Acuerdes de Mi"
2003: Velo de Novia – "Más Que Tu Amigo"
2006: Mundo de Fieras – "Antes de Que Te Vayas"
2010: Teresa – "A Dónde Vamos a Parar"
2013:  Lo Que La Vida Me Robó – "El Perdedor" (duet with Enrique Iglesias)
2017:  En tierras salvajes – "Estaré Contigo"

Awards and nominations

Billboard Latin Music Awards

|-
|rowspan="2"|1996
|rowspan="2"|Marco Antonio Solís
|Songwriter of the Year
|
|-
|Producer of the Year
|
|-
|rowspan="2"|1997
|rowspan="2"|Marco Antonio Solís
|Songwriter of the Year
|
|-
|Producer of the Year
|
|-
|1998
|Marco Antonio Solís
|Songwriter of the Year
|
|-
|rowspan="3"|2000
|rowspan="2"|Marco Antonio Solís
|Hot Latin Tracks Artist of the Year
|
|-
|Songwriter of the Year
|
|-
|"Si Te Pudiera Mentir"
|Hot Latin Track of the Year
|
|-
|rowspan="3"|2002
|rowspan="2"|Marco Antonio Solís
|Hot Latin Tracks Artist of the Year
|
|-
|Songwriter of the Year
|
|-
|"O Me Voy O Te Vas"
|Hot Latin Track of the Year
|
|-
|2004
|Marco Antonio Solís
|Songwriter of the Year
|
|-
|rowspan="4"|2005
|rowspan="3"|Marco Antonio Solís
|Hot Latin Tracks Artist of the Year
|
|-
|Songwriter of the Year
|
|-
|Lifetime Achievement Award
|
|-
|"Más Que Tu Amigo"
|Hot Latin Track of the Year
|
|-
|2007
|Marco Antonio Solís
|Songwriter of the Year
|
|-
|rowspan="2"|2008
|rowspan="2"|Marco Antonio Solís
|Songwriter of the Year
|
|-
|Producer of the Year
|
|-
|2009
|Marco Antonio Solís
|Songwriter of the Year
|
|-
|2016
|Marco Antonio Solís
|Lifetime Achievement Award
|
|}

Billboard Latin Music Hall of Fame

|-
|2000
|Marco Antonio Solís
|Billboard Latin Music Hall of Fame
|
|}

Latin American Music Awards 
The Latin American Music Awards are the Spanish-language version of the American Music Awards hosted on U.S. Spanish-language television network, Telemundo.

|-
| 2015
| Marco Antonio Solís 
| Favorite Male Artist – Pop/Rock
| 
|-

Latin Grammy Awards
The Latin Grammy Awards are awarded annually by the Latin Academy of Recording Arts & Sciences in the United States. Solís has received five awards from nine nominations.

|-
| 2002
| "Más de Mi Alma"
| Best Male Pop Vocal Album
| 
|-
| 2004
| "Tu Amor o Tu Desprecio"
| Best Regional Mexican Song
| 
|-
| 2005
| "Razón de Sobra"
| Best Male Pop Vocal Album
| 
|-
| rowspan="2" scope="row"|2009
| "No Molestar"
| Best Regional Mexican Song
| 
|-
| No Molestar
| Best Grupero Album
| 
|-
| rowspan="3" scope="row"| 2011
| "Tú Me Vuelves Loco"
| Best Regional Mexican Song
| 
|-
| En Total Plenitud
| Best Male Pop Vocal Album
| 
|-
| "A Dónde Vamos a Parar"
| Song of the Year
| 
|-
| 2014
| "De Mil Amores"
| Best Regional Mexican Song
| 
|}
 Each year is linked to the article about the Latin Grammy Awards held that year.

Lo Nuestro Awards
The Lo Nuestro Awards are awarded annually by the television network Univision in the United States. Solís has received two awards from thirteen nominations.

|-
| 1994
| Inalcanzable
|rowspan="2" scope="row"| Pop Album of the Year
| 
|-
|rowspan="2" scope="row"| 1996
| Por Amor a Mi Pueblo
| 
|-
|Himself
|Excellence Award
| 
|-
|rowspan="2" scope="row"| 1997
| Marco Antonio Solís (himself)
| Pop Male Artist of the Year
| 
|-
| En Pleno Vuelo
|rowspan="2" scope="row"| Pop Album of the Year
| 
|-
|-
|rowspan="3" scope="row"| 2002
| Pop Male Artist of the Year
| 
|-
| Más de Mi Alma
| Pop Album of the Year
| 
|-
| "O Me Voy o Te Vas"
| Pop Song of the Year
| 
|-
| 2014
|rowspan="2" scope="row"| Marco Antonio Solís (himself)
| Pop Male Artist of the Year
| 
|-
|rowspan="4" scope="row"| 2015
| Pop Male Artist of the Year
| 
|-
| Gracias Por Estar Aquí
| Pop Album of the Year
| 
|-
| "El Perdedor"
|rowspan="2" scope="row"| Pop Song of the Year
| 
|-
| "Tres Semanas"
| 
|}
 Each year is linked to the article about the Lo Nuestro Awards held that year.

References

External links
Universal Music Latin Entertainment | Marco Antonio Solís
 Official site (Spanish)

1959 births
Living people
Fonovisa Records artists
Mexican male singer-songwriters
Mexican singer-songwriters
Latin pop singers
Latin Grammy Award winners
Singers from Michoacán
Universal Music Latin Entertainment artists
Grupera musicians
Latin music record producers
Latin music songwriters
Mexican record producers